Over the course of 127 seasons (from 1892 to 2022 excluding 1981, 1994, and 2020), 114 teams have won 100 or more games in a single Major League Baseball season. While this makes the feat a relatively common occurrence, the 100-win threshold remains the hallmark of the best teams in a given season. 

The franchise with the most 100-win seasons is the New York Yankees, who have done so 21 times, with the Oakland Athletics being second with ten occasions. Sixty different managers have led a team to a 100-win season, with only one occasion where a 100-win team was led by multiple managers. Twenty-four managers have led a franchise to two or more 100-win seasons; Sparky Anderson, Whitey Herzog, Tony La Russa, Dusty Baker and Buck Showalter are the only managers to have led multiple franchises to a 100-win season. Joe McCarthy and Bobby Cox have the most 100-win seasons by a manager with six. Seven of the 30 major league franchises have never recorded a season with 100 wins. Among rookie managers, seven have accomplished 100 wins in their inaugural season, with the first being Mickey Cochrane in 1934 and the current last one being Rocco Baldelli in 2019. 68 of the 114 100-win teams have advanced to the World Series, with 38 of those 68 going on to win the Series (for a percentage of ), while 20 teams that have won 100 games have lost in the first round of the postseason, with 19 being in the Division Series and one being in the Wild Card Series (introduced in 2022 full-time).

Listed below are the Major League Baseball franchises that have had seasons with 100 or more wins.

Distinctions
On eight occasions, the level of high-quality competition within a league or division has resulted in a team winning 100 games but still failing to qualify for postseason play. Six of these eight seasons occurred before the start of the two-division league structure and expanded playoff format introduced in 1969, but none have occurred since the first year under the Divisional Series format in 1995.

While there have been 25 seasons with two or more 100-win teams, only ten times have at least three teams finished at or above the mark, and 2019 and 2022 are the only instances of four teams finishing at or above the 100-win threshold.

The 2018 season was the first time either league had more than two teams win 100 or more games in the same season; the Boston Red Sox, Houston Astros, and New York Yankees of the American League each won 100 or more games, with two led by rookie managers (no season had ever seen more than 100 wins from two managers before). There were no 100-win teams in the National League that season. The 2019 season marked the first time four Major League teams won 100 or more games, with the American League's Houston Astros, New York Yankees, and Minnesota Twins winning their divisions with at least 100 wins, and the Los Angeles Dodgers of the National League doing the same.

With the Divisional Series and Wild Card format in place today, it is extremely unlikely for a team with a 100-win regular season to fail to qualify for at least a Wild Card berth. Only the 2001 Oakland Athletics, the 2018 New York Yankees, the 2021 Los Angeles Dodgers and the 2022 New York Mets made the playoffs as 100-win Wild Card teams.

The following teams missed the postseason despite winning 100 games or more during the regular season:
 1909 Chicago Cubs: Finished 2nd in NL
 1915 Detroit Tigers: Finished 2nd in AL
 1942 Brooklyn Dodgers: Finished 2nd in NL
 1954 New York Yankees: Finished 2nd in AL
 1961 Detroit Tigers: Finished 2nd in AL
 1962 Los Angeles Dodgers ( [101-61 + 1-2 playoff against San Francisco Giants]): Finished 2nd in NL
 1980 Baltimore Orioles: Finished 2nd in AL East
 1993 San Francisco Giants: Finished 2nd in NL West

Legend

Season records

See also
List of best Major League Baseball season win–loss records

Notes

References

Wins
Major League Baseball managers
Major League Baseball statistics